An ornithological handbook is a book (or series of books) giving summarised information either about the birds of a particular geographical area or a particular taxonomic group of birds. Some handbooks cover many aspects of their subjects' biology, whereas others focus on specific topics, particularly identification.

List of ornithological handbooks with a worldwide scope
 Handbook of the Birds of the World
 The Bird families of the world series
 The Helm Identification Guides series

List of ornithological handbooks with a geographic scope
 The Birds of Africa
 The Birds of the Malay Peninsula
 Birds of North America
 The Birds of South America
 Birds of South Asia. The Ripley Guide
 Birds of the Western Palearctic  
Handbook of Western Palearctic Birds: Passerines: A Photographic Guide (Christopher Helm Publishers Ltd, 2018)
 Handbook of Australian, New Zealand and Antarctic Birds, the standard text of Australian ornithology, abbreviated as HANZAB
 Birds of Western Australia, the handbook by Serventy and Whittell, published in 1948 through five editions.